Czyprki  is a village in the administrative district of Gmina Miłki, within Giżycko County, Warmian-Masurian Voivodeship, in northern Poland. 

It lies just to the east of the former "Ostwall", the eastern fortification line of Germany in the second World war.

Notable features include a prominent shrine to Jesus and Mary next to the bus station.

References

Villages in Giżycko County